Yono may refer to:

 YONO, an integrated digital banking platform in India
 Yono, Saitama, a former city, now part of Saitama, Japan
 Yono Station, a railway station
 Yono the Destroyer, a character in the television series Kim Possible
 Yono-class submarine

See also 
 Jonah (disambiguation)